Anna Friberger (born 1944) is a Swedish illustrator and set designer. Her work includes set design for Swedish television, animated movies for children's TV programs, record covers, and posters. She wrote and illustrated for Bamse, the popular Swedish comic book series. Anna has illustrated 76 books and written and illustrated two of her own children's books. She is one of the most popular illustrators in Sweden. She lives in Malmö.

References 

Living people
Swedish children's book illustrators
Swedish illustrators
1944 births
People from Malmö
Swedish women illustrators